Lacunicambarus miltus, the rusty gravedigger, is a species of crayfish in the family Cambaridae. It is found in the southeastern United States.

References

Further reading

 

Cambaridae
Articles created by Qbugbot
Crustaceans described in 1978
Freshwater crustaceans of North America
Taxa named by Joseph F. Fitzpatrick Jr.
Taxobox binomials not recognized by IUCN